The 1924 Harvard Crimson football team represented Harvard University in the 1924 college football season. In its sixth season under head coach Bob Fisher, Harvard compiled a 4–4 record and outscored opponents by a total of 78 to 61. Malcolm W. Greenough was the team captain. The team played its home games at Harvard Stadium in Boston.

Schedule

References

Harvard
Harvard Crimson football seasons
Harvard Crimson football
1920s in Boston